What Couples Do (Spanish: Los helechos - Enredos de parejas) is a 2018 Peruvian comedy-drama film directed by Antolín Prieto (in his directorial debut) and written by Prieto & Fernanda Gutiérrez . The film uses the improvisation technique commonly seen in the theater, making it the first Peruvian film to use it. It stars Nuria Frigola Torrent, Miguel Vargas, Pedro Kanashiro, Fernanda Gutierrez, Fernando Neyra, Mariana Palau and Pold Gastello.

Synopsis 
Two couples flee the city for a weekend. Toshiro and Helena, married with two daughters; and Felipe and Iris, enjoying life freely in their early 30s. They all stay at a country estate run by Sol and Miguel, lovers and hippies at heart. The weekend begins with laughter and camaraderie. But as untold desires and hidden agendas are revealed, both urban pairs get into crisis. Decisions must be made and voices must be heard in this story of the incredible complexity of love in its many forms.

Cast 
The actors participating in this film are:

 Nuria Frigola Torrent as Iris
 Miguel Vargas as Felipe Octavio
 Pedro Kanashiro as Toshiro
 Fernanda Gutierrez as Helena
 Fernando Neyra as Miguel
 Mariana Palau as Sol
 Pold Gastello as Pisco Seller

Release 
The film premiered in August 2018 as part of the Official Fiction Film Competition of the 2018 Lima PUCP Film Festival. After receiving an Incentive for Film Distribution from the Ministry of Culture in 2018, the film was commercially released on June 6, 2018 in Peruvian theaters.

References

External links 

 

2018 films
2018 comedy-drama films
2018 independent films
Peruvian comedy-drama films
2010s Spanish-language films
2010s Peruvian films
Films set in Peru
Films shot in Peru
2018 directorial debut films